Oldtown Covered Bridge, near Oldtown, Kentucky, was listed on the National Register of Historic Places in 1976.

It is located east of Kentucky Route 1, south of Oldtown. It brings Frazer Branch Road 750 over the Little Sandy River.  It is a two-span Burr truss bridge.

See also 
 Bennett's Mill Covered Bridge: also in Greenup County, Kentucky
 National Register of Historic Places listings in Greenup County, Kentucky

References

Covered bridges on the National Register of Historic Places in Kentucky
National Register of Historic Places in Greenup County, Kentucky
Bridges in Greenup County, Kentucky
Road bridges on the National Register of Historic Places in Kentucky
Wooden bridges in Kentucky
Burr Truss bridges in the United States